John McCracken may refer to:

 John McCracken (artist) (1934–2011), American minimalist artist
 John McCracken (historian) (1938–2017), Scottish historian and Africanist

See also
 John Henry MacCracken (1875–1948), American academic administrator